Sobrefoz is one of nine parishes (administrative divisions) in Ponga, a municipality within the province and autonomous community of Asturias, in northern Spain.

The population is 93 (INE 2007).

Villages and hamlets
 Sobrefoz 
 Ventaniella 

Parishes in Ponga